John Michael Wallace-Hadrill,  (29 September 1916 – 3 November 1985) was a senior academic and one of the foremost historians of the early Merovingian period.

Wallace-Hadrill was born on 29 September 1916 in Bromsgrove, where his father was a master at Bromsgrove School. He was Professor of Mediaeval History at the University of Manchester between 1955 and 1961. He then became a Senior Research Fellow of Merton College in the University of Oxford (where he held the office of Sub-Warden) from 1961 till 1974. He was Chichele Professor of Modern History at Oxford from 1974 to 1983 and, between 1974 and 1985, a Fellow at All Souls College, Oxford.

He was elected a Fellow of the British Academy in 1969 and delivered the Ford Lectures in 1971. He was a Vice-President of the Royal Historical Society  between 1973 and 1976. He was appointed a Commander of the Order of the British Empire (CBE) in 1982. He is the father of the Roman historian Andrew Wallace-Hadrill and the brother of church historian, D.S. Wallace-Hadrill.

Bibliography 
 The Barbarian West, 400–1000 (1952).
 The Fourth Book of the Chronicle of Fredegar with Its Continuations (1960).
 The Long-haired Kings (London, 1962). 
 Early Germanic Kingship in England and the Continent (Oxford, 1971).
 Early Medieval history (1976).
 The Frankish Church (1983).
 Ideal and reality in Frankish and Anglo-Saxon society: studies presented to J.M. Wallace-Hadrill (1983).
 Bede's Ecclesiastical History of the English People: A Historical Commentary (Oxford, 1988).

References

Citations

Sources 

 
 

1916 births
1985 deaths
Fellows of the British Academy
Commanders of the Order of the British Empire
British Anglicans
Anglo-Saxon studies scholars
Germanic studies scholars
Fellows of All Souls College, Oxford
Chichele Professors of Modern History
Fellows of Merton College, Oxford
20th-century British historians
Corresponding Fellows of the Medieval Academy of America
Chetham Society
Lancashire Parish Register Society